First Ward School is a historic school building located at Elkins, Randolph County, West Virginia.  It was built in 1907, is a two-story brick masonry structure, with full basement and sandstone trim. It has a slate covered hipped roof and is in the Classical Revival style. The interior features hard maple flooring and quarter-sawn oak staircases, wainscotings, built-in bookcases, doors, moldings, and trim work.  It was built as a combined elementary and high school.  It served as an elementary school alone from 1926 to 1976, when the building was retired as a school.

It was listed on the National Register of Historic Places in 2009.

References

Neoclassical architecture in West Virginia
Defunct schools in West Virginia
Educational institutions disestablished in 1976
Former school buildings in the United States
School buildings completed in 1907
Schools in Randolph County, West Virginia
School buildings on the National Register of Historic Places in West Virginia
National Register of Historic Places in Randolph County, West Virginia
Buildings and structures in Elkins, West Virginia
1907 establishments in West Virginia